Oliverio Rincón Quintana (born 24 April 1968) is a Colombian former road bicycle racer. He is the older brother of Daniel Rincón.

Major results

1988
 4th Overall Clásico RCN
1st Stage 8
1989
 1st  Overall Vuelta a Colombia
1st Stages 5 & 7
 3rd Overall Clásico RCN
1990
 10th Overall Critérium du Dauphiné Libéré
1991
 1st  Overall Escalada a Montjuïc
1st Stages 1 & 2
 1st Stage 6 Vuelta a Burgos
 2nd Subida al Naranco
 5th Overall Critérium du Dauphiné Libéré
 5th Overall Setmana Catalana de Ciclisme
 6th Overall Vuelta a Colombia
 8th Overall Volta a Catalunya
 10th Overall Vuelta a España
 10th Ov3rall Vuelta a Murcia
1992
 3rd Overall Escalada a Montjuïc
 3rd Overall Tour of Galicia
 3rd Giro della Provincia di reggio Calabria
1993
 2nd Overall Critérium du Dauphiné Libéré
1st Stage 6
 1st Stage 15 Tour de France
 1st Stage 5 Vuelta a Aragón
 2nd Subida al Naranco
 3rd Overall Escalada a Montjuïc
 4th Overall Vuelta a España
1st Stage 17
 7th Overall Volta a Catalunya
1994
 1st Classique des Alpes
 5th Overall Vuelta a España
 9th Subida al Naranco
1995
 4th Overall Vuelta a los Valles Mineros
 5th Overall Giro d'Italia
1st Stage 14
 6th Overall Tour de Romandie
 8th Road race, UCI Road World Championships
1996
 1st Stage 17 Vuelta a España

Grand Tour general classification results timeline

External links

Palmares by cyclingbase.com

1968 births
Colombian male cyclists
Living people
Colombian Tour de France stage winners
Colombian Vuelta a España stage winners
Colombian Giro d'Italia stage winners
Sportspeople from Boyacá Department
20th-century Colombian people